Halictophagus is a genus of insects in the family Halictophagidae.

Species
H. abdominalis Kathirithamby, 1993    
H. acutus Bohart, 1943     
H. americanus Perkins, 1905
H. ancylophallus Kifune & Hirashima, 1989
H. angustipes Kifune & Hirashima, 1989
H. antennalus Kathirithamby, 1993
H. australensis Perkins, 1905

External links 
Description - TOL

Strepsiptera